Dennis O'Connor may refer to:
 Dennis O'Connor (judge), Associate Chief Justice of Ontario
 J. Dennis O'Connor (born 1942), Chancellor of the University of Pittsburgh
 Dennis James O'Connor (1886–1946), Quebec politician
 Dennis O'Connor (actor) in The Park Is Mine

See also
Denis O'Conor
Denis Charles Joseph O'Conor
Denis Maurice O'Conor
Denis O'Connor (disambiguation)